Henry Jay Forman is both Distinguished Professor Emeritus of Biochemistry at the University of California, Merced. and Research Professor Emeritus of Gerontology at the USC Leonard Davis School of Gerontology. He is a specialist in free radical biology and chemistry, antioxidant defense, and pioneered work in redox signaling including the mechanisms of induced resistance to oxidative stress.

Biography
He received his degrees from Queens College of the City University of New York and Columbia University. After holding a Post-Doctoral position at Duke University, he hed faculty positions in biochemistry, physiology, molecular pharmacology, toxicology, pediatrics, and pathology. He was previously a faculty member at the University of Pennsylvania, the USC School of Medicine and the USC School of Pharmacy and then moved to the University of Alabama, Birmingham, School of Public Health, where he was the Chairman of Environmental Health Sciences. He was one of the founding faculty at the University of California, Merced.

Career
Forman has  focused almost his entire career on redox (free radical) biology and chemistry He has worked on the biological generation and defense against oxidants and on the cellular use of oxidants as physiologically important signals. His work contains over 200 publications. His major current research focuses on understanding how aging causes increased susceptibility to air pollution. 

He is the Past President of the Society for Free Radical Biology and Medicine and Executive Editor of Archives of Biochemistry and Biophysics. He served as the Governor’s appointed scientist on the San Joaquin Valley Air Pollution Control District Governing Board. He is a Fellow of the Society of Free Radical Biology and Medicine (now Society for Redox Biology and Medicine).

Forman was the recipient of the Society for Free Radical Research - Europe Award Lectureship and the Lifetime Achievement Award from the Society for Redox biology and Medicine. He has served on the Scientific Policy Committee of the American Physiological Society.

References

Further reading
Forman, H.J., Maiorino, M., Ursini, F. Signaling functions of reactive oxygen species. Biochemistry 49: 835-42, 2010
Forman, H.J., Davies, K.J., and Ursini, F. How do nutritional antioxidants really work?: nucleophilic tone and parahormesis versus free radical scavenging in vivo. Free Radic. Biol. Med. 66: 24-35, 2014
Ursini, F., Maiorino, M., and Forman, H.J. Redox Homeostasis: The Golden Mean of Healthy Living Redox Biol. (online), 2016
Forman, H.J. Redox signaling: an evolution from free radicals to aging. Free Radic Biol Med. 97:398-407, 2016

External links
UC Merced Faculty Page
Publications

American gerontologists
21st-century American chemists
University of Southern California faculty
Living people
Year of birth missing (living people)